Tallinn School No. 21 is a secondary school in Tallinn, Estonia. The school was founded as the Tallinn kroonualgkool No. 21. The first schoolhouse was a wooden house on J. Poska 6a. In 1923–1924 as the number of students grew, a new schoolhouse was needed.

Schoolhouse
The schoolhouse is at Raua 6. In 2001-2003 the schoolhouse was renovated.

Education
The school provides both primary and secondary education. In the secondary stage (gymnasium) students can choose between real-sciences, English, and social and human sciences.

Notable alumni
Maarja-Liis Ilus
Piret Järvis
Veiko-Vello Palm
Märt Põder 
Markus Robam
Artjom Savitski
Katrin Siska
Uku Suviste
Karl-Erik Taukar
Urve Tiidus
Igor Volke
Evelin Võigemast

References

External links

Schools in Tallinn
History of Tallinn